Cienfuegos Province Botanical Garden, officially, Jardín Botánico de Cienfuegos, also known as Jardín Botánico Soledad, is located 14 kilometers from Cienfuegos city centre.

Overview

With 97 hectares it is one of the oldest institution botanic gardens on the island. The garden was founded in 1901 by Edwin F. Atkins and his wife, Katherine Wrisley Atkins. They arrived in Cuba in 1899 in search of the island's most precious commodity: sugarcane.

Atkins built the “Soledad” sugar mill and soon after a research center dedicated to investigation and enhancement of sugar cane under the name: "Harvard Botanical Station for Tropical Research and Sugar Cane Investigation".

Mr. and Mrs. Atkins were also fond of plant collecting and soon afterwards started a tropical and rare species garden in the backyard of their estate where plants from as far as India and China were grown in tropical Cuba.

Today the garden has a large collection of tropical exotic plants (2000+ species) clustered in 670 genera and 125 botanical families. Among the most complete collections are orchids (400+), palms (230+), ficuses (65+) and bamboos (29).

References

External links
Photo gallery of Cienfuegos Garden

Cienfuegos
Cienfuegos
Tourist attractions in Cienfuegos Province